Niger Delta Science School (NDSS), formerly known as Ompadec Science Centre, is a specialist science secondary school in Port Harcourt, Nigeria. It is located within the Rivers State College of Arts and Science main campus in Rumuola. It is an all senior secondary school, having SS1 - SS3. The approximate coordinates of the school are:   (4.835739, 6.995757).

See also
List of schools in Port Harcourt

References

Schools in Port Harcourt
Secondary schools in Rivers State
Science schools in Rivers State